"Bitch Please II" is a song by American rapper Eminem, featuring guest vocals from Dr. Dre, Snoop Dogg, Xzibit, and Nate Dogg, and is the fifth and final single from The Marshall Mathers LP.

"Bitch Please II" is one of the few collaborations between Snoop Dogg and Eminem. The other times that they united were in 2022 at the Super Bowl LVI Halftime Show and on the track "From the D 2 the LBC".

Background
The song is a sequel to the single "Bitch Please" by Snoop Dogg, released on April 29, 1999.

Charts

Certifications

Personal 
Credits adapted from the album's liner notes and Tidal

 Eminem – vocals
 Dr. Dre – vocals, production, mixing
 Snoop Dogg – vocals 
 Xzibit – vocals 
 Nate Dogg – vocals 
 Mel-Man - writing
 Richard "Segal" Huredia – engineering
 Mike Elizondo – bass, keyboards
 Jim McCrone – engineering assistance

References

2000 songs
2000 singles
Eminem songs
Snoop Dogg songs
Dr. Dre songs
Xzibit songs
Nate Dogg songs
Songs written by Eminem
Songs written by Snoop Dogg
Songs written by Xzibit
Interscope Records singles
Songs written by Mike Elizondo
Song recordings produced by Dr. Dre
Aftermath Entertainment singles
Shady Records singles
G-funk songs
Gangsta rap songs
Hardcore hip hop songs
Sequel songs
Posse cuts
Songs written by Nate Dogg